"For a Breath I Tarry" is a  1966 post-apocalyptic novelette by American writer Roger Zelazny, which was nominated for the Hugo Award for Best Novelette in 1967. Taking place long after the self-extinction of Man, it recounts the tale of Frost, a sentient machine. While humans have long ago caused their own extinction the sentient machines they created continue the work of rebuilding a shattered Earth.

Along the way, the story explores the differences between Man and Machine, the former experiencing the world qualitatively, while the latter do so quantitatively. This is illustrated by philosophical conversations between Frost and another machine named Mordel. 

Driving the plot and setting its tone are Frost's intention to become a Man and allusions to other literature, most specifically the first chapter of the Book of Job, both in situation and language, as verses are both quoted directly and paraphrased. Additionally, echoes of the first three chapters of the Book of Genesis appear. Finally, Frost and Mordel enter into a Faustian bargain, though with better results than in the original.

The other major character is the Beta Machine, Frost's equal in the southern hemisphere (Frost has control over the northern hemisphere). It is hinted that, while being a machine, Beta has a feminine personality. After finally succeeding in his thousand-year quest to become a human (via recovered DNA), Beta accepts Frost's offer to join him in becoming human - implying the possibility of a rebirth of the human race.

The novelette has appeared in collections of Zelazny's works and in anthologies.

The title is from a phrase in A. E.  Housman's collection A Shropshire Lad.

References

External links
"For a Breath I Tarry"
"Alternate Source"

Science fiction short stories
1966 short stories
Short stories by Roger Zelazny
Artificial intelligence in fiction
Post-apocalyptic short stories